A Girl like Me is a 2005 documentary by Kiri Davis. The seven-minute documentary examines such things as the importance of color, hair and facial features for young African American women. It won the Diversity Award at the 6th Annual Media That Matters film festival in New York City, and has received coverage  on various American media sources, such as CNN, ABC, NPR. The documentary has been shown on HBO. The documentary was made as part of Reel Works Teen Filmmaking.

Synopsis
The video begins with interviews with Kiri Davis and her peers about how black features did not conform to society's standards of beauty. The next section was a repeat of an experiment conducted by Kenneth Clark in the 1940s where African-American children were asked to choose between black or white dolls. In the original experiment(s) the majority of the children choose the white dolls. When Davis repeated the experiment 15 out of 21 children also choose the white dolls over the black, giving similar reasons as the original subjects, associating white with being pretty or good and black with ugly or bad. The dolls used in the documentary were identical except for skin colour.

Awards
The Diversity Award at the 6th Annual Media That Matters film festival
The SILVERDOCS Audience Award for a Short Documentary.

Screenings
Tribeca Film Festival
The 6th Annual Media That Matters. 
Silverdocs: AFI/Discovery Channel Documentary Festival
HBO

External links
Edney, Hazel Trice. "New 'Doll Test' Produces Ugly Results", Baltimore Times, August 16, 2006. 
Johnson, L. A. (2006). Documentary, Studies Renew Debate about Skin Color's Impact. Pittsburgh Post-Gazette. Pittsburgh: .
A Girl Like Me, Entire documentary on mediathatmattersfest.org
"A Girl Like Me", Media That Matters, Biography of Davis
"A Girl Like Me", Discussion of the background of making the documentary
 "BLACK KIDS’ SELF IMAGE-NO PROGRESS" by Marian Wright Edelman 
"A Girl Like Me", Good Morning, America, ABC, October 11, 2006.
"African-American Images: The New Doll Test", Talk of the Nation, NPR, October 2, 2006. 
 "A Girl Like Me" appears in RACE: Are we so different?  a public education program developed by the American Anthropological Association.

American independent films
Discrimination based on skin color
Universal Pictures films
Documentary films about African Americans
2005 films
American documentary films
2005 documentary films
2000s English-language films
2000s American films